Walter Reid Craig (29 December 1846 – 6 July 1923) was an English cricketer active in 1874 who played for Lancashire. He was born in Pilkington and died in Hangleton. He appeared in one first-class match as a righthanded batsman, scoring eight runs with a highest score of 7.

Notes

1846 births
1923 deaths
English cricketers
Lancashire cricketers
Cricketers from Greater Manchester